Same Kind of Different as Me is a 2017 American Christian drama film directed by Michael Carney, in his feature directorial debut, and written by Ron Hall, Alexander Foard and Michael Carney. It is based on the 2006 book of the same name by Hall, Denver Moore and Lynn Vincent. The film stars Greg Kinnear, Renée Zellweger, Djimon Hounsou, Olivia Holt, Jon Voight, and Stephanie Leigh Schlund. The film was released on October 20, 2017, by Pure Flix Entertainment. The film received mixed reviews but still made $6.4 million in cinemas against a total budget of $6.5 million including marketing and advertising.

Plot
Ron Hall, a successful art dealer, comes to the home of Julio, a man he previously sold a painting to. Julio allows Ron to write a book about his life and a life-changing event he experienced.

Two years earlier, Ron admits to his wife Debbie that he had an affair. Although very upset, she gives Ron another chance, but only if he makes up for his selfishness by helping her out at the local homeless shelter. Initially, Ron is cynical about this and is anxious to get out. They both notice a rather violent member of the community and Debbie convinces Ron to offer his friendship to the man. The man is grateful for the friendship and introduces himself as Denver.

Over time, Ron and Debbie develop a heartwarming and inspiring friendship with Denver. They even invite him over to spend the night. Denver reveals his life story to them: he grew up in the care of his grandmother who died in a fire that consumed their home. He soon left and became a sharecropper on a plantation where he was attacked by the KKK for having a white friend and talking to a white woman. Eventually, Denver fled the plantation and came to a town where he was arrested for attempted robbery. In jail, he killed a small group of prisoners when they attacked him. Ron and Debbie forgive him for his actions which he deeply appreciates. It is soon revealed that Debbie has terminal cancer.

Ron and Debbie invite Denver to spend the holidays with their family including Ron's mother Tommye and alcoholic father Earl whom Ron does not get along with. Earl further sours their relationship when he insults both Denver and Debbie causing Ron to sever ties with him which hurts Denver who never had a father and thinks there is a good man inside Earl.

Debbie has her final goodbyes to her children, Regan and Carson. She then tells Ron to have happiness with whomever he wants. She tells him where she wants to be buried. Later, both Ron and Denver share a dance with Debbie. Not long after, Debbie dies.

After the funeral, Ron stops visiting Denver. Back in the present, Ron leaves Julio's house and goes to Denver where they have a happy reunion. Denver tells Ron to visit Earl. At his parents' house, Ron finds a much happier Earl who has given up drinking and made up with Tommye who thanks Ron. Ron and Denver go camping near Debbie's grave and reminisce about her.

In closing titles, it is revealed Ron finished his book with Denver's help and the two travel cross-country sharing their story and getting funds for other homeless shelters.

Cast
Greg Kinnear as Ron Hall
Renée Zellweger as Deborah Hall
Djimon Hounsou as Denver Moore
Jon Voight as Earl Hall
Olivia Holt as Regan Hall
Austin Filson as Carson Hall
Geraldine Singer as Tommye Hall
Daniel Zacapa as Julio Larraz
Dana Gourrier as Willow
Thomas Francis Murphy as Chef Jim
Ann Mahoney as Clara
Theodus Crane as Tiny
David Dino Wells Jr. as Mister
Pedro Lucero as Killer
Mary Hunter Johnston as Little Girl
Lucky Johnson as Thug (Clara's Pimp)
David Jensen as Homeless Man #1
Trey McGriff as Homeless Man #2
Michael Southworth as Homeless Man #3
Ashton Cotton as Denver (Boy)
Bradford Whalen as Denver (Young Adult)
Tonea Stewart as Big Mama
Stephanie Leigh Schlund as C.C.
Lara Grice as Bobby's mother
Mykel Shannon Jenkins as B.B.
Nyles Julian Steele as Chook
David Jensen as Bum
Kenda Benwar as Janet
Ty Parker as Bobby
John Newberg as Hank
Calvin Williams as Uncle James

Production
On October 20, 2014, Renée Zellweger joined the cast to play Deborah. On October 28, 2014, Greg Kinnear, Djimon Hounsou and Jon Voight joined the cast. On November 7, 2014, Olivia Holt joined the cast to play Regan Hall. Principal photography began on October 27, 2014, and ended on December 19, 2014.

Release
The film was originally scheduled to be released on April 29, 2016, but was pushed back to February 3, 2017. On December 30, 2016, the film was pushed back to October 20, 2017, and was acquired by Pure Flix Entertainment. The film was released on DVD and Blu-ray on February 20, 2018.

Reception
On review aggregator website Rotten Tomatoes, the film has an approval rating of 40% based on ten reviews and an average rating of 5.8/10. On Metacritic, which assigns a normalized rating, the film has a score of 47 out of 100 based on seven critics, indicating "mixed or average reviews".

References

External links
 
 
 

2017 films
2017 drama films
American drama films
Films about Christianity
Films about evangelicalism
Films based on non-fiction books
Films set in Mississippi
Films shot in Mississippi
Paramount Pictures films
Pure Flix Entertainment films
2017 directorial debut films
Films scored by John Paesano
2010s English-language films
2010s American films